The Paul Schmitt P.S.3 was a French World War I biplane bomber that was built in small numbers but primarily used as a trainer.

Development 
The P.S.3 was unusual in that the entire wing cellule was designed to have its angle of incidence adjusted from 0° to 12° while in flight. When set at the maximum, this gave the aircraft a pronounced back-stagger. This was possible because the wing was attached to the fuselage by a single pivot, and controlled by a jackscrew in the cockpit. This allowed for an unusually broad speed range, so that a minimum speed of only  was achieved.
The fuselage was built up from welded steel tubes, with a square cross section forward tapering to a triangle section aft.

One example was built as a floatplane, however unlike most of the landplanes, it was powered by a  Canton Unné P9 liquid cooled radial in place of the Gnome rotaries normally used.

Operational history 
Although intended as a bomber, it was only ever built in small numbers, and was quickly relegated to use as a trainer, partly because the Aéronautique Militaire had already chosen the Voisin III as their standard bomber.

Victorin Garaix set a number of speed and height records while carrying passengers in 1914.

The floatplane was exported to a private buyer the US in 1916, only to later be taken on strength by the United States Navy in April 1917 with the serial A-52, however it was used primarily as an instructional airframe at Pensacola for training groundcrew.

Operators 
 
Aéronautique Militaire 

United States Navy

Specifications (Paul Schmitt P.S.3)

References

Citations

Bibliography

 

1910s French bomber aircraft
Paul Schmitt aircraft
Rotary-engined aircraft
Biplanes
Aircraft first flown in 1915
Single-engined tractor aircraft